The table below details the complete Grand Prix racing results for Williams Grand Prix Engineering. The team has also competed in several non-championship Formula One races.

Formula One World Championship results

Works team entries

1970s
(key)

1980s
(key)

1990s
(key)

2000s
(key)

2010s
(key)

2020s
(key)

Notes
* – Season still in progress.
† – Driver failed to finish the race, but was classified as they had completed greater than 90% of the race distance.
‡ – Half points awarded as less than 75% of race distance was completed.

Results of other Williams cars
(key) (results in bold indicate pole position; results in italics indicate fastest lap)

Formula One non-championship race results
(key) (results in bold indicate pole position; results in italics indicate fastest lap)

Notes

References

Formula One constructor results
results